There are at least 13 members of the fumitory and poppy order, Papaverales, found in Montana. Some of these species are exotics (not native to Montana) and some species have been designated as Species of Concern.

Fumary
Family: Fumariaceae
Corydalis aurea, golden corydalis
Corydalis sempervirens, pale corydalis
Dicentra uniflora, steer's-head
Fumaria officinalis, drug fumitory
Fumaria vaillantii, earthsmoke

Poppy

Family: Papaveraceae
Argemone polyanthemos, white prickly-poppy
Chelidonium majus, celandine
Glaucium corniculatum, blackspot hornpoppy
Papaver argemone, pale rough-fruit poppy
Papaver pygmaeum, alpine glacier poppy
Papaver radicatum ssp. kluanensis, alpine poppy
Papaver rhoeas, corn poppy
Papaver somniferum, opium poppy

Further reading

See also
List of dicotyledons of Montana

Notes

Montana
Montana